Foreign Exchange, which debuted on June 27, 2005, is a business show on CNBC World focusing exclusively on trading in the currency markets.

Foreign Exchange is CNBC World's first original live program, is anchored by a rotating group of reporters from CNBC's Global Headquarters (was previously anchored by The Wall Street Journals Bob O'Brien), and Dow Jones Newswires' Nick Hastings as a contributor from CNBC Europe headquarters in London.

The show now airs weekdays from 8:30 to 8:45 AM ET.

External links
 

CNBC World original programming
2005 American television series debuts
2000s American television news shows
2010s American television news shows
2020s American television news shows
2000s American television talk shows
2010s American television talk shows
2020s American television talk shows
Business-related television series
Television articles with disputed naming style